The Cochin State Forest Tramway was a   cable railway line that ran from the Parambikulam Wildlife Sanctuary in Palakkad District to the town of Chalakudy in Thrissur District in India. Operating from 1907 to 1963, it served the State of Cochin and brought prosperity by enabling the transport of teak and rosewood from the forest into town. These goods could then be exported abroad.

History

Inception
The idea of a forest tramway was put forward by J.C. Kolhoff, first Conservator of Forests of the city of Cochin, and was implemented by V. Alwar Chetty, a forest officer on special duty. British officers Haldwell and Floukes performed the initial survey and route. R.E. Haffield was the first tramway engineer who cleared the forests and laid down the lines. The tramway was built during the rule of Rama Varma XV, Maharaja of Cochin (1895 to 1914). Sir Oliver Russell, 2nd Baron Ampthill, the Governor of Madras, inaugurated its construction on October 3, 1905. The tramway began operating in 1907. On June 26, 1907, the Maharaja of Cochin passed the Cochin Forest Tramway Act, which provided for the protection and management of the tramway.

Tram routes
The tramway was divided into three sections: the first started from Chalakudy and ended at Anapantham, covering a length of 21 miles; the second ran from Kavalai to Pothupara, covering six miles; and the third ran from Komalapara to Chinnar, covering 22.5 miles. The total length of tramway was 49.5 miles (79.5 km).

Machinery
Chalakudy used to house the tramway workshop and timber yard. The section had two locomotives to pull the trucks and saloons. The locomotives, rolling stock and machinery for the tramway were supplied by Orenstein and Koppel of Germany. P&W MacLennan of the U.K. supplied the bridges and culverts. K.R. Menon was the last tramway engineer. The tramway system had double lines and worked on rollers and cables. Empty wagons were rolled up while loaded wagons were pushed down along the other rails.

Demise
In 1926, the special finance committee recommended the abolition of the tramway, but was rejected by the Government in 1928. Another special committee was set up in 1950 under the chairmanship of the Chief Conservator of Forests, which recommended discontinuing of the tramway. In 1953, another commission was appointed but given the report that tramway should be revived at any cost. Finally in 1963, after serving 56 years and making modern Cochin Port a present-day commercial harbour and Cochin City, the economic hub, the Cochin State Forest Tramway was abolished on the basis of a special finance committee report.
The staff was absorbed in various departments of Government.

Legacy
The tramway was an engineering wonder in that period for South India. The money was used for building ports, bridges, roads, colleges, schools, etc. Cochin Port, a major port on the Arabian Sea – Indian Ocean sea-route, was constructed by the earnings from the tramway. Willingdon Island, which was created during construction of Cochin Port, was also bankrolled by tramway revenues.

References

Further reading
 
 Travel article: "Forest Track", Outlook Traveller (November 2006). Text and photographs by Sanjiv Valsan "The mountain route of the long forgotten Cochin State Forest Tramway is reborn as a jungle trail." 
 
 From UC College, Aluva, Department of History: An extract from the "Environmental History" chapter of  Dr. Sebastian Joseph's 2010 thesis, Cochin Forests and the British, submitted as part of the Kerala Council for Historical Research's (KCHR) Post-Doctoral Fellowship. The thesis was the basis of above 2016 book.

External links
 
 

Tram transport in India
Metre gauge railways in India
Defunct railway companies of India
Transport in Palakkad district
Transport in Thrissur
History of Thrissur district
Kingdom of Cochin
Railway companies established in 1907
Railway companies disestablished in 1963
1963 disestablishments in India
Indian companies established in 1907